Universities and Left Review was a socialist magazine that published seven issues between 1957 and 1959.

History

Universities and Left Review was founded in 1957 by Oxford students Raphael Samuel, Gabriel Pearson, Charles Taylor, and Stuart Hall.

The initial impetus behind the magazine came from the events of 1956, particularly the Suez crisis, the Soviet invasion of Hungary and Khrushchev's revelations about the Stalin's purges, that triggered shockwaves throughout the British left. As Hall was later to write, these events were "as significant to us as 1968 was to become to a later generation."

The magazine's first issue emerged in spring of 1957, and contained essays by three of the founding editors, Pearson, Hall and Taylor, as well as contributions from the artist Peter de Francia, Lindsay Anderson the noted British New Wave filmmaker, the economist Joan Robinson, historians E.P. Thompson, Eric Hobsbawm and Isaac Deutscher, and the town planner Graeme Shankland. Later issues would include essays by Samuel, Raymond Williams, Richard Hoggart, Isaac Deutscher, John Strachey, Peter Sedgwick, Ralph Miliband, Karel Reisz, Margot Jefferys, John Berger and others, and feature design by future design director of Penguin Books, Germano Facetti.

The magazine was self-consciously inspired by Left Review, the literary and cultural magazine of the Communist Party of Great Britain that developed a sophisticated modernist cultural political in the 1930s. It was equally inspired by the socialist humanist magazine The Reasoner, founded by E.P. Thompson in 1956, whose aim was to espouse a form of Marxist humanism against Communist Party orthodoxy. ULR would, however, be marked from its predecessors by its openness to debate, as well the influence of the burgeoning youth culture of late 1950s Britain. Notable was the debate on "classlessness," inaugurated by Hall's essay "A Sense of Classlessness" from ULR 5, that sparked responses from both Samuel and E.P. Thompson in later issues.

In late 1959, ULR merged with fellow socialist magazine New Reasoner to produce the New Left Review.

See also
New Left
New Left Review
New Reasoner
Communist Party Historians Group

External links
Barry Amiel and Norman Melburn Trust website All the issues of the journal are available in digital format copyright free (CC copyright).

References

Bibliography
 

 

 

 

 

 

Magazines published in London
1957 establishments in the United Kingdom
Magazines established in 1957
Political magazines published in the United Kingdom
Socialist magazines
New Left

Defunct political magazines published in the United Kingdom
Magazines disestablished in 1960